The Mk 153 Shoulder-Launched Multipurpose Assault Weapon (SMAW) is a smoothbore shoulder-fired rocket launcher. It is a portable assault weapon (i.e., bunker buster) and has a secondary anti-armor ability. Developed from the B-300, it was introduced to United States Armed Forces in 1984. It has a maximum effective range of  against a tank-sized target.

It can be used to destroy bunkers and other fortifications during assault operations; it can also destroy other designated targets using the dual mode rocket, and main battle tanks using the high-explosive anti-tank rocket. Operations in Afghanistan and Iraq saw a thermobaric rocket added (described as a "Novel Explosive" (NE)), which can collapse a building.

Service history
The SMAW system (launcher, ammunition and logistics support) was fielded in 1984 as a United States Marine Corps–unique system. The Mod 0 demonstrated several shortcomings, resulting in a series of modifications in the mid-2000s. These modifications included a re-sleeving process for bubbled launch tubes, rewriting/drafting operator and technical manuals, and a kit to reduce environmental intrusion into the trigger mechanism. This also includes an optical sight modification to allow the high-explosive anti-armor (HEAA) rocket to be used effectively against moving armor targets. The U.S. Armed Forces fielded boresight bracket kits which correct the loss of accurate boresight issues between the launch tube and spotting rifle. During Operation Desert Storm, 150 launchers and 5,000 rockets were deployed by the United States Army. Initially the Army showed interest in the system but ultimately returned the launchers and any unused rockets to the Marine Corps. Later, the U.S. Army developed the SMAW-D ("Disposable"), designated by the Army as the M141 Bunker Defeat Munition.

Follow-On To SMAW
In 2002, the Corps began a program to develop a successor to the SMAW system, tentatively titled "Follow-On To SMAW". The contract was awarded to Lockheed Martin and Israel Military Industries (IMI); this resulted in the enhanced FGM-172 SRAW. In combat operations, it was ultimately used to augment, rather than replace, the SMAW system.

SMAW II program
In 2008, a replacement program was again initiated and titled the SMAW II. It was developed in tandem with a round capable of being fired from an enclosed area without ill effects on the environment and personnel. Its combined weight is — for the launcher,  for the rocket. The contract was worth up to

SMAW II Serpent

In 2012, Raytheon Missile Systems developed a SMAW II launcher named Serpent, and Nammo Talley developed new rounds for the Serpent. The Serpent is similar in many respects to the first SMAW launcher, except that it replaces the standard SMAW launcher's spotting gun with more sophisticated fire control electronics. The sighting unit on the launcher is enclosed in a unique protective cage, which is also a carry handle. The Serpent fires the same rounds as the standard SMAW and supports new and improved/enhanced rounds.

Design
Compared to the Israel Military Industries' (IMI Systems) B-300 weapon that it was developed from, the SMAW has slower projectile velocities, it and its ammunition are both heavier, and it takes a second crew member to keep up with the B-300's rate-of-fire, but some of its projectile options have longer ranges than the B-300. The Mk 153 SMAW has an  diameter tube and fires  rockets. It is a man-portable weapon system consisting of the Mk 153 launcher, the Mk 3 Mod 0 Encased High-Explosive, Dual-Purpose (HEDP) rocket, the Mk 6 Mod 0 Encased High-Explosive, Anti-Armor (HEAA) Rocket, the Mk 7 Mod 0 Common Encased Practice Rocket, the Mk 80 Mod 0 Encased Novel Explosive (NE) rocket, and the Mk 217 Mod 0 spotting rifle cartridge.

The launcher consists of the launch tube, spotting rifle, electro-mechanical firing mechanism, mounting brackets, open battle sights and a mount for the Mk 42 Mod 0 day sight or AN/PVS-4 or AN/PVS-17B night sights. The launch tube is made of fiberglass-epoxy composite material with a gelcoat on the bore. The spotting rifle is mounted on the right side of the launch tube. It functions semi-automatically by primer actuation, meaning that when fired the primer sets back and unlocks the breech of the spotting rifle, ejecting the spent round. The firing mechanism mechanically fires the spotting rifle and uses a magnet to fire the rocket. The mounting brackets connect the components and provide the means for boresighting the weapon, while the encased rockets are loaded at the rear of the launcher. The spotting cartridges are stored in a magazine in the cap of the encased rocket.

The 9×51mm Mk 217 spotting round is ballistically matched to the rocket and serves to increase the gunner's first-round hit probability. Each round consists of a special 9 mm projectile which contains a tracer compound, crimped into a 7.62×51mm NATO casing with a .22 Hornet primer. The system can be used in conjunction with the AN/PEQ-2 aiming light in place of the spotting rifle.

As with all of these types of recoilless rocket weapons, the backblast that is created when it is fired is a primary safety concern. When the rocket is fired, the rocket propellant is expended entirely within the rocket encasement. This is the cause of the extremely loud and violent backblast. This backblast extends in a 90-meter, 60° cone to the rear of the weapon. An assistant gunner is often used during employment of the weapon system to monitor the backblast area and clear it of fellow troops, or to notify the gunner of obstructions that could reflect the force of the backblast back at the gun team. The gunner is only cleared to launch a rocket when he hears the command "Backblast area secure" from his assistant gunner. Rounds are under development that would enable a user to fire the rocket from an enclosed building without risk of injury.

The Mk 153 Mod 2 is an enhanced variant, featuring an electronic modular ballistic sight (MBS) in place of the 9 mm spotting system. The MBS has a laser rangefinder and thermal weapon sight to provide a firing solution using a displaced reticle, where crosshairs are adjusted for distance and environmental factors; it is lighter, more reliable, and can be detached from the launcher. Other improvements include increased pad size on the forward grip and foldable backup iron sights. The Mod 2 systems were expected to replace the existing inventory by October 2020.

Rockets

The Mk 4 Mod 0 Encased High-Explosive, Anti-Armor, Practice Rocket is used in training. The warhead consists of a blue plastic projectile attached to a rocket motor similar to the HEDP rocket. The rocket contains no explosive. It does not damage a target except by kinetic energy. On impact, the plastic warhead ruptures, dispensing an inert white spotting powder.

The Mk 3 Mod 0 Encased High-Explosive, Dual Purpose (HEDP) rocket is effective against bunkers, masonry and concrete walls and light armor. Initiated by a crush switch in its nose, the HEDP rocket is able to distinguish between hard and soft targets resulting in greater penetration into soft targets for increased damage potential.

The Mk 6 Mod 0 Encased High-Explosive, Anti-Armor (HEAA) rocket is effective against current tanks without added armor, and uses a standoff rod on the detonator, allowing the explosive force to be focused on a small point and for maximum damage against targets. The HEAA round can penetrate up to the equivalent of 600 mm of rolled homogeneous steel.

SMAW-NE (Novel Explosive)
The Mk 80 Mod 0 Encased Novel Explosive (SMAW-NE) rocket is effective against caves and bunkers. The SMAW-NE has a  charge of PBXIH-135, an enhanced-blast warhead. The Indian Head Naval Surface Warfare Center teamed with Marine Corps Systems Command and Talley Defense Systems to respond to an urgent U.S. Marine Corps need for a shoulder-launched enhanced-blast warhead in 2003. It was used in combat during both the First and Second offensives in Fallujah, in 2004.

Operators

Current operators
 : Lebanese Armed Forces
 : Pakistan Armed Forces
 : Republic of China Marine Corps
 : United States Marine Corps
 : Armed Forces of Ukraine

See also
 B-300
 Carl Gustaf 8.4cm recoilless rifle
 Breda Folgore
 LRAC F1
 M141 Bunker Defeat Munition (SMAW-D)
 M79 Osa
 Kestrel (rocket launcher)

References

External links

 SMAW – Global Security
 SMAW at FAS
 United States Marine Corps Introduction to Crew Served Weapons
 U.S. Marine Corps Technical Manual Operator's Manual https://www.scribd.com/doc/36175656/TM-08673A-10-1B-83mm-SMAW-Mk

Anti-tank rockets of the United States
United States Marine Corps equipment
Weapons of the Republic of China
Thermobaric weapons
Military equipment introduced in the 1980s